Serbia, like most former monarchies in Europe, has had crowns once worn by its rulers. The various Serbian principalities and kingdoms were organised around a number of different royal dynasties. Many of these invested in symbols of royalty which has led to a number of distinctive crowns, jewels and other treasures of incredible wealth surviving to the present day. As far as is known, there are four royal crowns once worn by Serbian kings or princes that have survived to the present day, of which just one is kept in the modern Republic of Serbia today.

Nemanjić Crowns
The Nemanjić Crown Jewels are the oldest of the surviving pieces of Serbian royal regalia. They were used in the coronation ceremonies of members of the medieval House of Nemanjić.  The 14th Century Crown of King Stephen III is kept at Cetinje Monastery in the Republic of Montenegro. Another crown which had once belonged to medieval Serbian rulers is kept in the Kaiserliche Schatzkammer (Imperial Treasury) in Vienna, Austria. Also, at the Kaiserliche Schatzkammer are found two further crowns once worn by members of the medieval Nemanjić dynasty; one of which was later attributed to Stephen Bocskai. Together with these is a golden mantle (buckle) of unknown origin which is believed to have been captured by the Serbs from the Ottomans at Brasov.

Karađorđević Crown
The Karađorđević Crown Jewels were created in 1904 for the coronation of King Peter I. The pieces were made from materials that included bronze taken from the cannon Karađorđe used during the First Serbian Uprising. This gesture was symbolic  because 1904 was the 100th anniversary of that uprising. The regalia was made in Paris by the famous Falise brothers jewellery company and is currently the only Serbian crown kept in the territory of the Republic of Serbia.

Regalia
The Karađorđević Serbian Royal Regalia consist of the following:
Royal crown (Also known as the Karađorđević Crown), with details such as the Serbian coat of arms
Royal orb
Royal scepter
Royal mantle buckle
Royal mantle

The crown, scepter, and orb are decorated with gemstones found in Serbia and enameled in the national colours of red, blue, and white. The royal mantle is made of purple velvet, embroidered with gold and lined with ermine fur.

Gallery

See also
History of Serbia
List of Serbian monarchs
Kingdom of Serbia
Serbian Empire

References

External links
Official Website

Crowns (headgear)
Serbia
National symbols of Serbia
National symbols of Yugoslavia
Serbian monarchy